Peristeri (Greek: Περιστέρι, meaning "pigeon/dove" in Greek) is a suburban municipality in the western part of the Athens agglomeration, Greece. With 139,981 inhabitants (2011 census), it is the seventh-largest municipality of Greece by population.

History
The ancient deme Leuconoe, is believed that it was located at Peristeri.

Geography

It lies between the Egaleo Mountain in the northwest and the Cephissus river in the southeast. Its built-up area is continuous with that of central Athens and the neighbouring suburbs Aigaleo, Chaidari, Petroupoli, Ilion and Agioi Anargyroi.

Transportation

Motorway 1 (Athens-Thessaloniki) passes through the southeastern part of the municipality. Athinon Avenue (Greek National Road 8 Athens-Korinthos-Patras) passes through the southwestern part. Peristeri is served by three Athens metro stations on Line 2: Anthoupoli, Peristeri and Agios Antonios. The Kifissos Bus Terminal where long-distance buses from Peloponnese, Epirus, Macedonia, Ionian Islands and Thrace arrive, stands at the east border of Peristeri near Sepolia.

Historical population

Sports
The most important sport clubs based in Peristeri are Atromitos with presence in Super League Greece and  Europa League qualification rounds  and Peristeri BC, with long-time presence in A1 Ethniki basketball & in European competitions, such as the FIBA Korać Cup, Euroleague & FIBA Europe Cup.

Peristeri Arena
The Peristeri Arena (or Andreas Papandreou Arena) is an indoor basketball sporting arena.  The seating capacity of the arena is 4,000 people. The arena is owned by the municipality of Peristeri. The arena is currently home to the Greek professional basketball team Peristeri Athens of the Greek A1 League.

The hall was opened in the year 1989. The arena is named after the late Andreas Papandreou, who was the former prime minister of Greece. The arena is an older, smaller version of the Larissa Neapolis Arena and the Dimitris Tofalos Arena, which were based on Peristeri Arena, but built 6 years later and with a larger seating capacity.

Landmarks

 Cathedral
Peristeri Arena
Peristeri Stadium
 Town Hall

Culture

Peristeri has one municipal outdoor cinema and four municipal theatres.

Notable people
 Angela Dimitriou, singer
 Evangelos Koronios, professional basketball player and coach
 Giannis Poulopoulos, singer-songwriter
 Grigoris Bithikotsis (1922–2005), singer and songwriter
 Nikoleta Kyriakopoulou (born 1986), Pole vault athlete
 Vangelis Ploios, actor
 Vangelis Mantzaris, basketball player
Leonidas Michailidis, brain surgeon
 Orfeas Tzortzopoulos, drummer of Suicidal Angels
 Argiris Pedoulakis, professional basketball player and coach

International relations

Peristeri is twinned with:
 Iaşi, Romania
 Rousse, Bulgaria

References

External links

 

Municipalities of Attica
Populated places in West Athens (regional unit)